Orotelli is a comune (municipality) in the Province of Nuoro in the Italian region Sardinia, located about  north of Cagliari and about  west of Nuoro.

Orotelli borders the following municipalities: Bono, Bottidda, Illorai, Oniferi, Orani.

History

Human presence in the area is testified as early as the Nuragic period. In the Middle Ages it was part of the Giudicato of Torres and then of that of Arborea, until falling to the Aragonese.

Main sights
Parish church of San Giovanni Battista (1116), originally in Romanesque style. It has a 14th-century bell tower with a bas-relief decoration including figures and arcane symbols.
Several nuraghes and Giants' graves

References

Cities and towns in Sardinia